The second season of Pinoy Dream Academy formally began on June 14, 2008. Nikki Gil and Toni Gonzaga reprise their roles as hosts of the show, but Gonzaga now handles the main hosting plum while Gil appears both on the Probation Nights and Little Dreamers Gala/Expulsion Night. Billy Crawford has joined this season as the host of the late afternoon edition Pinoy Dream Academy Überture.

A new logo is also used for this season, having an old-fashioned microphone and the word "Dream" using a different font than the rest of the title. Also, a new version of the theme song Awit ng Pangarap sung by first season winner Yeng Constantino is being used for this season, although the original version was also used, especially during Gala Nights.

New to this season was a "Little Dreamers" competition for children aged 6 to 10. On July 6, 2008, twelve children were chosen to become the Academy's resident Little Scholars. In this end, a new puppet named Billilit (portmanteau of "Billy" and bulilit or kid) joins the show as semi-host and Billy's sidekick on Übertube as far as any topic regarding this side competition is concerned.

The Little Dreamers competition continued for several weekends after the season finale of the second season for the "adults" on September 13 and 14, 2008. The Little Dreamers took part on the said season finale despite this. The competition ended on October 5, 2008 at the Dolphy Theatre of the ABS-CBN building.

Little Dreamers

The Little Dreamers competition was started on July 6, 2008, for children who are six to ten years old. Twelve children were chosen to compete in this side competition, taking place within the duration of this season. Understandably, they do not stay at the Academy due to regular schooling on weekdays, entering it during weekends to have voice lessons from the Voice Mentors.

Philip Cesar Nadela a.k.a. Philip Nolasco (9, from General Santos City)
Songs Performed
 Music and Me - Michael Jackson
 Sama na Kayo - Smokey Mountain
 Anak ng Pasig - Geneva Cruz
 Diana - Paul Anka
 We are the Champions - Queen
 Growing Up - Gary Valenciano
 Beat It - Michael Jackson
 Luha - Aegis
 How Could You Say You Love Me - Sarah Geronimo
 Thank You For The Music - ABBA
 Uptown Girl - Billy Joel - duet with Angelo
 You Raise Me Up - Josh Groban,  Little Grand Star Dreamer - October 5, 2008
Ana Mae "Amy" Libot a.k.a. Amy Nobleza (6, from Las Piñas)
Songs Performed
 Greatest Love of All - Whitney Houston
 Sabi Mo - Smokey Mountain
 Laguna - Sampaguita
 Diamonds Are Forever - Shirley Bassey
 One Moment in Time - Whitney Houston
 Someone's Waiting for You - Lea Salonga
 What's Love Got to Do with It - Tina Turner
 Halik - Aegis
 Saving All My Love For You - Whitney Houston
 I've Got The Music In Me - Kiki Dee
 One Night Only - from Dreamgirls - duet with Cristina
 Ako Ang Nasawi, Ako Ang Nagwagi - Dulce,  Little Second Star Dreamer - October 5, 2008
Allen Angelo Garcia (6, from Oriental Mindoro)
Songs Performed
 I Want to Break Free - Queen
 Da Coconut Nut - Smokey Mountain
 Heal the World - Michael Jackson
 (Oh,) Pretty Woman - Roy Orbison
 Eye of the Tiger - Survivor
 Awit ng Kabataan - Rivermaya
 Babaero - Randy Santiago
 Salamat - The Dawn
 Only You - Sam Milby
 Your Song - Elton John
 Uptown Girl - Billy Joel - duet with Philip
 Sweet Child O Mine - Guns N' Roses,  Little Third Star Dreamer - October 5, 2008
Aubrey Vallerie Caraan a.k.a. Aubrey Carreon (10, from Batangas)
Songs Performed
 The Voice Within - Christina Aguilera
 Can This be Love - Smokey Mountain
 Masdan Mo ang mga Bata- Asin
 Inseparable - Natalie Cole
 The Main Event - Barbra Streisand
 Big Girls Don't Cry - Fergie
 On My Own - Whitney Houston
 Nosi Balasi? - Sampaguita
 Wind Beneath My Wings - Bette Midler
 You Are My Song - Regine Velasquez
 Broken Vow - Lara Fabian - duet with Risie
 This Is My Now - Jordin Sparks,  Top 4 Finalist - October 5, 2008
Risie Joan Mayo a.k.a. Risie Joan (9, from Palawan)
Songs Performed
 Tuwing Umuulan - Regine Velasquez
 Kailan - Smokey Mountain
 Big Yellow Taxi - Joni Mitchell
 Smoke Gets in Your Eyes - The Platters
 Ever Since the World Began - Survivor
 Because of You - Kelly Clarkson
 Bituing Walang Ningning - Sharon Cuneta
 Tell Me Where It Hurts - MYMP
 On The Wings Of Love - Regine Velasquez
 A Song For You - The Carpenters
 Broken Vow - Lara Fabian - duet with Aubrey
 Narito Ako - Regine Velasquez,  Top 5 Finalist - October 5, 2008
Ma. Cristina Angela De Leon (9, from Cavite)
Songs Performed
 If We Hold on Together - Diana Ross
 Mama - Smokey Mountain
 Isang Mundo, Isang Awit - Leah Navarro
 This is My Life - Shirley Bassey
 I Believe I can Fly - Yolanda Adams
 Yesterday's Dream - Donna Cruz
 To Love You More - Celine Dion
 Hallelujah - Bamboo
 The Power Of Love - Celine Dion
 Dadaanin Ko Na Lang Sa Musika - 14K
 One Night Only - Beyoncé - duet with Amy
 May Bukas Pa - Rico J. Puno,  Top 6 Finalist - October 5, 2008
Jerome Ventinilla (7, from Marikina)
Songs Performed
 Paraiso - Smokey Mountain
 Nahan - Smokey Mountain
 The Animal Song - Savage Garden
 Sweet Caroline - Neil Diamond,  Expelled - August 3, 2008
 Stand Up For Love - Destiny's Child, Back-to-School, Re-enrolled - August 31, 2008
 Makita Kang Muli - Sugarfree
 Pangako - Regine Velasquez
 I Write the Songs - Barry Manilow,  Expelled - September 28, 2008
Shania Shane Hermogenes (6, from Bulacan)
Songs Performed
 Fame - Irene Cara
 Best Friend - Smokey Mountain, Expelled - July 20, 2008
 It Can Only Get Better - Charice Pempengco, Back-to-School, Re-enrolled - August 31, 2008
 Sundo - Imago
 Ikaw - Regine Velasquez, Expelled - September 21, 2008
Kelly Mercado (8, from Valenzuela City)
Songs Performed
 Hero - Mariah Carey
 Kahit Habang Buhay - Smokey Mountain
 Masdan mo ang Kapaligiran - Asin
 New York, New York - Liza Minnelli
 Looking Through the Eyes of Love - Melissa Manchester
 Pagdating ng Panahon - Aiza Seguerra
 Dreaming of You - Selena, Expelled - August 24, 2008
 My Heart Will Go On - Celine Dion, Back-to-School - August 31, 2008
Dean Carlo Logo (7, from Laguna)
Songs Performed
 Complicated (Avril Lavigne song) - Avril Lavigne
 Street People - Smokey Mountain
 What a Wonderful World - Louis Armstrong
 Only You - The Platters
 Glory of Love - Peter Cetera
 Anak - Freddie Aguilar, Expelled - August 17, 2008
 Hataw Na - Gary Valenciano, Back-to-School - August 31, 2008
Nikki Brianne Samonte (8, from Nueva Ecija)
Songs Performed
 I am But a Small Voice - Lea Salonga
 Ligaw Tingin - Smokey Mountain
 From a Distance - Bette Midler
 The Greatest Performance of My Life - Shirley Bassey
 This used to be My Playground - Madonna, Expelled - August 10, 2008
 Ngayon - Roselle Nava, Back-to-School - August 31, 2008
Leon Matawaran (10, from Quezon City)
Songs Performed
 Tomorrow - Lea Salonga
 Better World - Smokey Mountain
 Bless the Beast and Children - The Carpenters, Expelled - July 27, 2008
 Fallin' - Teri DeSario, Back-to-School - August 31, 2008

Weekly song themes

Each week, the scholars will sing songs that fit a specific weekly theme. The dates shown are the dates of the Gala Nights.

Week 1 (July 13): None
Week 2 (July 20): Smokey Mountain tribute
Week 3 (July 27): Kalikasan (Nature)
Week 4 (August 3): Oldies but Goodies
Week 5 (August 10): Sports Themed Songs
Week 6 (August 17): Growing Up Themed Songs
Week 7 (August 24): Music Icons
Week 8 (August 31): Back-to-School (Wildcard Round)
Week 9 (September 7): Pinoy Rock
Week 10 (September 21): Their Parents' Theme Song
Week 11 (September 28): Songs that express their Passion for Singing

Jurors

Resident Juror
 Jimmy Antiporda
 Aiza Seguerra - August 3, 2008 onwards

Guest Jurors
 Geneva Cruz - July 13, 2008
 Erik Santos - July 13, 2008
 Nina - July 20, 2008
 Jeffrey Hidalgo - July 20, 2008
 Rachel Alejandro - July 27, 2008
 Barbie Almalbis - July 27, 2008
 Richard Poon - August 3, 2008
 Dingdong Avanzado - August 10, 2008
 Jessa Zaragoza - August 17, 2008
 Wency Cornejo - August 31, 2008
 Mcoy Fundales - September 7, 2008
 Sheryl Cruz - September 21, 2008

Expulsion nights elimination chart

In this part of the competition, the Little Dreamers also go through an elimination process where each week a scholar would be expelled from the Academy. Due to the fact that they are children, grades are never stated. Instead a scholar who is the "Outstanding Little Dreamer" (counterpart of the Star Scholar) is picked out; sometimes two are picked out if they have the same grade on the judges' score cards. Two students are labeled "Needs Improvement" and therefore become probationary students, one of which would be expelled.

Class cards are distributed to the Little Dreamers prior to the start of their Friday class. The ones who get a "star" are safe from being a probationary student and the Little Dreamers who get the letters "N. I." (which stand for "Needs Improvement") are the probationary students and are subjected to viewers votes.

The process of elimination for this side competition is similar to the older scholars; however, the probationary students are revealed to the viewers at the beginning of the Gala Performance Night. Voting is opened at the start of the show and is closed at the end of the Gala Performance Night, when one of the Little Dreamers with "N.I." marks is expelled from the Academy.

On the 7th Gala Night, it was announced that the next Gala Night will be the Back to School Round wherein the six expelled scholars will have the chance to return to the competition and once again battle it out for the title of Little Grand Star Dreamer.

: In the Back-to-School Week, the Top 6 Little Dreamers didn't perform. The six expelled scholars performed on stage and the jurors graded them. Based on those grades, Shane and Jerome were given the chance to once again battle it out and be part of the Top 8. 
: The Top 8 scholars performed and no expulsion took place. The following week had no Little Dreamers show to give way for the Grand Dream Nights of Pinoy Dream Academy Season 2.
: Due to having parotitis, Amy was unable to perform live, as prescribed by her doctor. However, the footage of her rehearsal with the live band was aired. Though she wasn't able to perform live, she is still a part of the Top 6 for being one of the Outstanding Little Dreamers last week along with Philip.

References

External links
 
 Official Multiply site
 

Pinoy Dream Academy
2008 Philippine television seasons